Convergence was a socialist political party in Guatemala.

History
In the 2015 general elections the party received 3.8% of the vote in the Congressional elections, winning three of the 158 seats.

Election results

Presidential elections

References

2015 establishments in Guatemala
2020 disestablishments in Guatemala
Anti-imperialist organizations
Defunct political parties in Guatemala
Defunct socialist parties in North America
Indigenist political parties in North America
Political parties established in 2015
Political parties disestablished in 2020
Progressive parties
Socialist parties in Guatemala